Vincenzo Capelli (born 26 October 1988) is an Italian rower. He competed in the men's four at the 2012 Summer Olympics and the men's eight event at the 2016 Summer Olympics.

At World level, he finished won the coxed pairs at the 2011 World Championship with Pierpaolo Frattini, coxed by Niccolo Fanchi and came third in the coxed pairs at the 2016 World Championships, with Mario Paonessa, coxed by Andrea Riva.

At European level, he finished second with the Italian men's eight at the 2012 European Championships.

References

External links
 

1988 births
Living people
Italian male rowers
Olympic rowers of Italy
Rowers at the 2012 Summer Olympics
Rowers at the 2016 Summer Olympics
World Rowing Championships medalists for Italy
Rowers from Rome
20th-century Italian people
21st-century Italian people